East Appleton is a hamlet in North Yorkshire, England. The poet Richard Braithwaite lived there on his estate, and was buried in the parish church. Roger Strickland later inherited the estate from Braithwaite's widow.

References

External links

Hamlets in North Yorkshire